Unión Deportiva Almería, S.A.D. is a Spanish professional football club based in Almería, in the autonomous community of Andalusia. Founded on 26 July 1989 and known as Almería Club de Fútbol until 2001, when it was renamed Unión Deportiva Almería. The club currently plays in the Spanish Primera División after winning the Segunda División title in 2022, and plays their home games at the 15,274-seat capacity Power Horse Stadium. they have won 16 Spanish trophies recorded before 1964.

History
The first football club in Almería was founded in 1909: el Almería Foot-Ball Club. Since then, several Almería football clubs appeared and disappeared. One of them was AD Almería, a team that played in La Liga between 1979–81, but disappeared in 1982, and was arguably UD Almería's predecessor. 

In 1989, a club named Almería Club de Fútbol was born, but in 2001 was renamed Unión Deportiva Almería. On 19 January 2001 the mayor of Almería Santiago Martínez Cabrejas announced in the city council that the new club UD Almería had been formed after the merger of two city teams - Polideportivo Almería and Almería CF. But UD Almería was not official until June 28, 2001, when Almería CF approved at the General Meeting of Shareholders the renaming. After playing one season in the second division, it was relegated to the third and the fourth divisions.

After spending several seasons in the second level, Almería side was first promoted to the top flight after finishing runner-up in the 2006–07 season. After some outstanding performances, as the away win against Deportivo de La Coruña 3–0 in the first La Liga match, the team achieved a final 8th league place in 2007–08. At the club's helm was coach Unai Emery, as striker Álvaro Negredo finished team topscorer with 13 goals.

After Emery left for Valencia CF, Gonzalo Arconada stepped in, but was sacked on 21 December 2008, after a string of poor results, albeit without ever reaching the last three. Mexican Hugo Sánchez took the job, and fared slightly better, for a final mid-table position.

In 2010–11, Almería reached the semifinals of the Copa del Rey for the first time ever. In the league, however, the club was finally relegated after a four-year spell in the top flight; in November 2010, coach Juan Manuel Lillo was fired after a 0–8 home loss against FC Barcelona (precisely the team that ousted the Andalusians in the domestic cup's last-four, with the same score, but on aggregate), and his successor José Luis Oltra met the same fate, in April 2011. He was replaced by Roberto Olabe.

After two seasons in the second level, Almería returned to the main category of Spanish football on 22 June 2013, after defeating Girona FC in the play-offs. After the departure of manager Javi Gracia, the club appointed their former player and manager of the reserves at the time Francisco Javier Rodríguez Vílchez; the team eventually managed to survive in 2013–14, finishing 16th.

Francisco was sacked in December 2014, after only managing two points out of 24, and was later replaced by Juan Ignacio Martínez. "JIM" also only lasted until April of the following year, and even with new manager Sergi Barjuán, the club was relegated after finishing 19th.

In the 2018–19 season, Almería finally escaped the tough fight for the permanence in Segunda División until the last matches as during 3 previous seasons. This time they were closer to the promotion play-offs to La Liga, and finished 10th from 22 teams participated.

On 2 August 2019, Turki Al-Sheikh became the owner of the club, replacing Alfonso García Gabarrón. He appointed Mohamed El Assy as general director, Dario Drudi as sporting director, who replaced Miguel Ángel Corona, and manager Óscar Fernández was replaced by Pedro Emanuel. On 5 November 2019, it was announced Guti replaced Emanuel. On 26 June 2020, he was ceased and replaced by Mario Silva, who was himself replaced by José Gomes on 27 July.

In August 2021, UD Almería (Mohamed El Assy) and the  agreed to a lease on the operation of the municipally-owned Estadio de los Juegos Mediterráneos for a 25-year period. In June 2022, the club achieved promotion to the first division by sealing a 1st position in the table, respectively, on the very last match day of the season, after spending seven years in the second tier.

Season to season

7 seasons in La Liga
16 seasons in Segunda División
6 seasons in Segunda División B
2 seasons in Tercera División
3 seasons in Categorías Regionales

Current squad
.

Reserve team

Out on loan

Technical staff

   Víctor Fortes

   Juan Ventaja   Mateo Ruiz

Notable players
Note: this list includes players that have appeared in at least 100 league games and/or have reached international status.

World Cup players
The following players have been selected by their country in the World Cup Finals, while playing for Almería.

  Kalu Uche (2010)
  Ramon Azeez (2014)

Uniform

1 The shirt contained messages such as Isla del Fraile or Corredor de Vida.

Honours
Segunda División: 2021–22

See also
UD Almería B – Almería's B team
AD Almería
List of managers
List of statistics

References

External links

Official website 
Futbolme team profile 
BDFutbol team profile
Almeria on kouragoal site

 
Football clubs in Andalusia
Segunda División clubs
Association football clubs established in 1989
1989 establishments in Spain
La Liga clubs